Sweet Pepper (German title: Lockendes Gift) is a 1929 German silent film directed by Fred Sauer and starring Paul Richter, Eve Gray and Margit Manstad.

The art direction was by Franz Schroedter.

Cast
 Paul Richter 
 Eve Gray 
 Margit Manstad
 Ressel Orla

References

Bibliography
 Quinlan, David. Quinlan's Film Stars. Batsford, 2000.

External links

1929 films
Films of the Weimar Republic
Films directed by Fred Sauer
German silent feature films
German black-and-white films